St Patrick's College (SPC) ( Punitha Pattiriciyār Kallūri) is a private school in Gurunagar, Jaffna, Sri Lanka. It was founded in 1850 by Roman Catholic missionaries.

History
The Jaffna Catholic English School was established in 1850 by Monsignor Orazio Bettacchini, an Italian Roman Catholic missionary. The school was later renamed Jaffna Boys' Seminary. The school was registered as a High School in 1881 and renamed St. Patrick's College on 10 January 1881. Rev John Smythe, formerly a member of Ceylon Civil Services, was appointed as its first Rector.

With a appointment of Brother Conway in 1862 as a Principal of the School, a new era of progress began in this institution. A numbers on roll expanded.  A high sense of responsibility and discipline prevailed in the school. The students took up the challenge and did well in their exams. Teachers too were dedicated and fully committed. Under his direction College made great strides and was successful from 1862 onwards. The first local examination ever to be held in Sri Lanka showed remarkable achievement.

Rev Charles Matthews, a Canadian University graduate had taught at St Patrick’s for the three years before succeeding Fr. Beaus as Rector, in 1906. He remained in office till 1936, except for a break of a short period and was indeed a chief architect of St Patrick's, having served the longest period. The achievement of the school during his time are too numerous to mention.  He organized the College and introduce rules and regulations and strict discipline. Studies and game were systematised and became popular. At this time, the London Matriculation examination results , secured for three years by St Patrick’s were the best in British Empire. In sports the College won championship in Soccer, Cricket and Athletics for many years in succession.

Rev Timothy Long (O.M.I) succeeded Fr. Matthews as rector  in 1936, and was at the helm till 1954. Under his guidance the college rose to the height of glory academically as well as in sports and in almost every sphere of educational and social development.

Most private schools in Ceylon were taken over by the government in 1960 but SPC chose to remain as a private and non-fee levying school.

The school motto is ” Fide et Labore”. Latin words which mean “Faith and Work”

Rev A.P. Thirumahan is the present rector of the college.

Big Match
SPC play Jaffna College in an annual cricket match known as the Battle of the Golds. The first match took place in 1917.

Rectors/principals

 1850–58 Patrick Foy
 1859–61 Rev. Bro. John Joseph Brown
 1862–70 Rev. Bro. Patrick Joseph Conway
 1870 Rev. Bro. Michael A. Murphy
 1870–74 Rev. Bro. ( Fr.) Patrick O Flanagan
 1874–75 T. W. McMahan
 1875–80 Rev. Bro. ( Fr.) Patrick O Flanagan
 1880–83 Rev. Bro. (Fr.) J. A. R. Smythe
 1883–85 Rev. Fr. Charles H. Lytton
 1885–88 Rev. Fr. Jules Collin
 1888–89 Rev. Fr. M. Dubreuil
 1889-01 Rev. Fr. Patrick Dunne
 1901–02 Rev. Fr. Jules Collin
 1902–05 Rev. Fr. Charles A. Beaud
 1905–21 Rev. Fr. Charles S. Matthews
 1921–24 Rev. Fr. John A. Guyomar
 1924–36 Rev. Fr. Charles S. Matthews
 1936–54 Rev. Fr. Timothy M. F. Long
 1954–60 Rev. Fr. S. N. Arulnesan
 1960–66 Rev. Fr. P. J. Jeevaratnam
 1966–76 Rev. Fr. T. A. J. Mathuranayagam
 1976–79 Rev. Fr. John A. Francis
 1979–92 Rev. Fr. G. A. Michael (Francis) Joseph
 1992-02 Rev. Fr. A. I. Bernard
 2002–07 Rev. Fr. Dr. Justin Gnanapragasam
 2008–17 Rev. Fr. Joe Selvanayagam
 2017–   Rev. Fr. A. P. Thirumahan

Notable alumni

 S. C. C. Anthony Pillai – Trade unionist and Member of Parliament.
 Leo Rajendram Antony – Roman Catholic Bishop of Trincomalee–Batticaloa.
 Anton Arulanandam – Secretary of the Amateur Athletic Association of Ceylon.
 Tissa Balasuriya – Roman Catholic priest and theologian.
 Bertram Bastiampillai – Professor of political science and history, Ombudsman/Parliamentary Commissioner for Administration.
 S.F. Chellapah – Director of Medical and Sanitary Services.
 Bastiampillai Deogupillai – Roman Catholic Bishop of Jaffna.
 Major General H. Luxman David.
 V. Dharmalingam – Member of Parliament for Uduvil.
 Jerome Emilianuspillai – Roman Catholic Bishop of Jaffna.
 Justin Gnanapragasam – Roman Catholic Bishop of Jaffna.
 E. L. B. Hurulle – Cabinet Minister, Member of Parliament, Governor of the North Central Province.
 W. L. Jeyasingham – Dean of the Faculty of Arts, University of Jaffna.
 Rayappu Joseph – Roman Catholic Bishop of Mannar.
 Valentine Joseph - Professor of mathematics.
 A. Kanagasabapathy – Mudaliyar of Mullaitivu District.
 W.M.T.B. Menikdiwela – Secretary to the President, Divisional Revenue Officer.
 N. Nadarajah – Judge, Supreme Court of Ceylon.
 V. Navaratnam – Member of Parliament for Kayts.
 Paul Perera – Roman Catholic Bishop of Kandy.
 Jaya Pathirana – Member of Parliament for Kurunegala, Judge, Supreme Court of Sri Lanka.
 G. G. Ponnambalam – Leader of the All Ceylon Tamil Congress, Member of Parliament.
 Kumar Ponnambalam – Leader of the All Ceylon Tamil Congress.
 T.J. Rajaratnam – High court judge.
 A. B. Rajendra – Member of the Senate.
 T. M. Sabaratnam – Member of the Legislative Council of Ceylon.
 R. Sampanthan – Leader of the Illankai Tamil Arasu Kachchi/Tamil United Liberation Front, Member of Parliament.
 Harry Sandrasagra – Member of the Legislative Council of Ceylon.
 Thomas Savundaranayagam – Roman Catholic Bishop of Jaffna.
 Antony Selvanayagam – Roman Catholic Bishop of Penang.
 S. Sivapalan – Member of Parliament for Trincomalee.
 Kingsley Swampillai – Roman Catholic Bishop of Trincomalee.
 Alfred Thambiayah – Member of Parliament for Kayts.
 T.T. Thambyahpillai – Astrophysicist.
 Xavier Thaninayagam – Tamil scholar.
 Kanthiah Vaithianathan – Cabinet Minister, Member of the Senate, Permanent Secretary.
 Susaipillai P. Vanderkoon – Mudaliyar of Kalpitiya District.
 Dominic Vendargon – Roman Catholic Archbishop of Kuala Lampur.
 V. Yogeswaran – Member of Parliament for Jaffna.
 Yogaswami – Spiritual master.

See also
 List of schools in Northern Province, Sri Lanka

References

Sources

External links
 
 
 
 
 

1850 establishments in Ceylon
Boarding schools in Sri Lanka
Boys' schools in Sri Lanka
Educational institutions established in 1850
Private schools in Sri Lanka
Roman Catholic schools in the Diocese of Jaffna
Schools in Jaffna
Schools in Sri Lanka founded by missionaries